Based on a True Story is the second album from American Idol finalist, Kimberley Locke. Kimberley chose this title because the songs on the album, 8 of which co-written by Kimberley herself, tell the true story of the emotions she dealt with during and after her relationship with her ex-fiance. She found that when she sat and talked with her collaborators about the issues she was working through, the songs began to write themselves.

Background and recording 
Kimberley Locke co-wrote ten of the album's songs, which she described as a "very personal and confessional" process.

Composition 
According to AllMusic's Andy Kellman, Based on a True Story is a pop album with influences from country, rock, and adult contemporary. Kellman cited the track "Doin' It Tonight" as an example of "urban-oriented dance-pop". Jonathan Bernstein of Entertainment Weekly the songs "Any Which Way" and "Everyday Angels" as a "lurching rocker" and an "Oprah-ready anthem of gratitude", respectively. He described the single "Change" as a "cathartic country ballad". Locke covers Freda Payne's 1970 single "Band of Gold" as a bonus track; she performed the song as a contestant on American Idol, along with Frenchie Davis. Bernstein wrote that Locke provides "a reverent cover of a chestnut".

Critical reception 

Gordon Ely of Billboard praised it as "powerfully performed and perfectly presented", and referred to Locke as "a major new artist in the making". Kellman praised the album as a "polished, professional set", though he felt the songs were "samey and not all that memorable". Despite his positive response to Locke's experimentation with musical genres, Bernstein wrote that she "fails to inject personality into these songs".

Track listing

Cut tracks
Only a month before the release of the album, a decision was made for Kimberley to record her versions of "Fall" and "Band of Gold". The label was so impressed by these recordings that two songs that had previously been recorded, "What I Gotta Do" and "Hey DJ (Let That Song Play)", were cut from the album. They remain unreleased.

Charts

Album

Singles

1 Remixed dance versions.

References

2007 albums
Kimberley Locke albums
Curb Records albums